Sybil Rachel Betty Cecile Cholmondeley, Marchioness of Cholmondeley  (born Sybil Rachel Betty Cecile Sassoon; 30 January 1894 – 26 December 1989), styled Countess of Rocksavage from 1913 to 1923, was a British socialite, patron of the arts, and Chief Staff Officer in the Women's Royal Naval Service (WRNS) during the Second World War. She belonged to the prominent Sassoon and Rothschild families.

Family and life

Sassoon was born in London, to a Jewish family. She was the daughter of Sir Edward Sassoon (1856–1912), 2nd Bt., and Baroness Aline Caroline de Rothschild (1865–1909). Her brother was Sir Philip Sassoon.

On 6 August 1913, she married George Cholmondeley, Earl of Rocksavage (19 May 1883 – 16 September 1968). He later succeeded as the 5th Marquess of Cholmondeley.  They had two sons and one daughter:
 Lady Aline Caroline Cholmondeley (5 October 1916 – 30 June 2015)
 George Hugh Cholmondeley, 6th Marquess of Cholmondeley (24 April 1919 – 13 March 1990)
 Lord John George Cholmondeley (15 November 1920 – October 1986)
Sassoon was largely responsible for restoring her husband's family estate, Houghton Hall, to its former glory. She was a generous patron of the arts and had an extensive art collection by the time of her death.

The Sybil Sassoon Gardens at Houghton were opened to the public in 1996.  Lady Sybil's grandson, the current marquess, developed the gardens in honour of his grandmother. In 2008, the garden was named Historic Houses Association and Christie's Garden of the Year. In "the pool garden", the entwined initials "SS" are represented in the outlines of the clipped box-hedge which surrounds plantings of lavender and rosemary. Sassoon died in Cheshire. She is buried in the Church of St Martin on the Houghton Hall estate. Through her son George Hugh Cholmondeley, Sybil is the great-grandmother of actor Jack Huston. 

She was Chief Staff Officer to Director WRNS from 12 November 1939 until 1946. On 9 February 1945 she was appointed as Superintendent of the Women's Royal Naval Service (WRNS) and the following year was made CBE.

Titles

She was identified by a number of changing titles during the several phases of her life:
 1894–1913: Miss Sybil Sassoon
 1913–1923: Countess of Rocksavage
 1923–1946: The Most Honourable The Marchioness of Cholmondeley
 1946–1968: The Most Honourable The Marchioness of Cholmondeley, CBE
 1968–1989: The Most Honourable The Dowager Marchioness of Cholmondeley, CBE

Honours
 1939–1945 Superintendent in Women's Royal Naval Service
 1939–1946 Chief Staff Officer in Women's Royal Naval Service
 1946 Birthday Honours Commander of Order of the British Empire (CBE)

See also
Rothschild family
Sassoon family
 Cholmondeley Award (poetry), established 1966

Notes

References
 Mosley, Charles Mosley. (2003). Burke's Peerage, Baronetage and Knightage. Stokesley : Burke's Peerage & Gentry, 2003. ; 
 Stansky, Peter. (2003).  Sassoon: the Worlds of Philip and Sybil. New Haven: Yale University Press.

External links
 WRNS Website
 Biodata

1894 births
1989 deaths
British Jews
British marchionesses
English marchionesses
Cholmondeley family
Royal Navy officers of World War II
Commanders of the Order of the British Empire
Military personnel from London
Women's Royal Naval Service officers
British women in World War II
Sassoon family
Daughters of baronets
Rothschild family
Place of birth missing
Place of death missing
British people of Indian-Jewish descent
Baghdadi Jews
People of Iraqi-Jewish descent
British people of Iraqi-Jewish descent
British people of French-Jewish descent
British people of German-Jewish descent
People of Indian-Jewish descent